Douroula is a department or commune of Mouhoun Province in western Burkina Faso. Its capital is Douroula. According to the 2006 census, the department has a total population of 12,806.

Towns and villages
 Douroula	(3 471 inhabitants) (capital)
 Bladi	(2,196 inhabitants)
 Kankono	(698 inhabitants)
 Kassakongo	(550 inhabitants)
 Kerebe	(1,000 inhabitants)
 Kirikongo	(1,188 inhabitants)
 Koussiri	(374 inhabitants)
 Noraotenga	(750 inhabitants)
 Sa	(340 inhabitants)
 Souma	(655 inhabitants)
 Tora	(520 inhabitants)
 Toroba	(977 inhabitants)

References

Departments of Burkina Faso
Mouhoun Province